Charles Nelson (April 15, 1901, Grängesberg, Sweden – January 19, 1997, Los Angeles, California, US) was an American film editor. He won the Academy Award for Best Film Editing in 1956 for Picnic, and was nominated in 1946 for A Song to Remember, and in 1965 for Cat Ballou.

Partial filmography
 Konga, the Wild Stallion (1939)
 Girls of the Road (1940)
The Secret Seven (1940)
 Riders of the Badlands (1941)
 Sahara (1943)
 A Song to Remember (1945)
 Gilda (1946)
 Renegades (1946)
 The Doolins of Oklahoma (1949)
 Picnic (1955)
 Return to Warbow (1958)
 Cat Ballou (1965)

References

External links

1901 births
1997 deaths
Best Film Editing Academy Award winners
American film editors
Swedish emigrants to the United States